Adlène Bensaïd (born November 3, 1981) is an Algerian football player who is currently playing for NA Hussein Dey in the Algerian Ligue Professionnelle 1.

Club career
On August 13, 2011, Bensaïd signed a two-year contract with NA Hussein Dey.

National team statistics

Honours
 Won the Algerian League once with JS Kabylie in 2008

References

External links
 

1981 births
Living people
Algerian footballers
USM Alger players
USM Blida players
CA Bordj Bou Arréridj players
Algerian Ligue Professionnelle 1 players
Algeria international footballers
JS Kabylie players
NA Hussein Dey players
People from Annaba
Algeria under-23 international footballers
Association football forwards
Competitors at the 2001 Mediterranean Games
Mediterranean Games competitors for Algeria
21st-century Algerian people